The Samford Bulldogs are the 17 varsity teams (8 men's and 9 women's) that represent Samford University in NCAA Division I athletics. The men's basketball team made its first NCAA Tournament appearances in 1999 and 2000.They were led by Reed Rawlings, Marc Salyers, and Chris Weaver. The women's basketball team made its initial NCAA tournament appearance in the 2011 NCAA Women's Division I Basketball Tournament and made its second consecutive appearance in the tournament in 2012. The baseball team made its first NCAA tournament appearance in the 2012 NCAA Division I baseball tournament, reaching the finals of the Tallahassee Regional. Additionally, the softball team made its first NCAA Tournament Appearance in 2016. For the first time in history, the Lady Bulldogs won the regular-season championship as well as the Tournament Championship to cap off a record high of 40 wins on the season. The school is a member of the Southern Conference in Division I of the NCAA (FCS in football), after moving from the Ohio Valley Conference in 2008. The Samford Athletics staff is headed by athletic director Martin Newton, whose appointment was announced on March 9, 2011.

Teams 
A member of the Southern Conference, Samford sponsors teams in eight men's and nine women's NCAA sanctioned sports:

Facilities

 Seibert Stadium - Seibert Stadium has been home to Samford's football team since 1958. Over the years, Seibert has seen some memorable football, including the Bobby Bowden era (1959–62), a one-loss season in 1971 and the Terry Bowden era, which ended with a 14-game Bulldog winning streak in the stadium. In Fall 2005, the playing surface, which had always been natural grass, was replaced by a new LSR Blade Synthetic Surface. The artificial turf also includes an extensive drainage system. The stadium is named for F. Page Seibert, a Daytona Beach, Fla., businessman, who donated the money for the completion of the stadium in 1961 with the addition of the stands of the west side. The largest crowd in Seibert Stadium history was in 1994 against Steve McNair and Alcorn State when 11,189 fans showed up. The stadium holds 6,700.
 Sullivan-Cooney Family Field House - The new  Cooney Family Field House is located in the south end of F. Page Seibert Stadium on the Samford campus. The $7.5 million building was completely funded with private financial support, according to W. Randall Pittman, Samford's vice president for university relations.  The new field house includes locker rooms, training rooms, weight rooms, equipment storage, offices and meeting rooms for Samford's football program.  A second-level terrace will be used to host special events, especially on football game days.  The building replaces facilities in Seibert Gym that date to that building's construction in the late 1950s.  A third level on the building will be finished at a later date.  That level will be used to house academic and administrative offices during transition periods of other new construction or building renovations on campus.  "This new building provides our football program with state-of-the-art facilities at an important time for Samford athletics," Bob Roller, the athletic director at the time of construction, said.  "With the university's move to the Southern Conference, it is critical for us to compete at all levels – on the field, in the classroom and facilities – with our new conference counterparts." Visiting teams will continue to use locker rooms and other facilities in Seibert Hall adjacent to the stadium, Roller said.  Gary C. Wyatt General Contractor LLC is the Birmingham-based contractor for the building, which was designed by Davis Architects of Birmingham.  During the 2014 season, the facility was renamed in honor of then head coach Pat Sullivan and is now known as the Sullivan-Cooney Family Field House.
 Seibert Hall - Originally opened in 1959, the lower floor played host to Samford basketball until the main gym was added in 1961. At that time, the basketball teams moved upstairs and have used the facility for the past 41 years. It has been home to Samford volleyball since 1987. It was replaced by Corts Arena in the new Hanna Center (see below) when that facility was completed in Fall 2007. Seibert Hall is also named for F. Page Seibert, a Dayton Beach, Fla., businessman, who donated the money for the completion of the upper floors. It was the largest donation at the time to then-Howard College.
 Pete Hanna Center - A new, state-of-the-art multi-purpose facility has been completed (with the exception of landscaping, and other minor details), as a part of Samford's improvement campaign, The Promise, next door to Seibert Hall and its Bashinsky Fieldhouse. The new building was christened Pete Hanna Center on Friday, October 19, 2007, while the arena itself was designated the Thomas E. and Marla H. Corts Arena. The facility was scheduled for completion by Homecoming weekend 2007 (October 19–21), but was still being worked on up to the last few hours before the first Homecoming event in the center was to take place on October 18. The new facility, one of the largest buildings ever built to strictly conform to Georgian style architecture, holds 5,000 for basketball and volleyball, 6,000 for concerts and commencements, and cost $32 million. Samford, wanting to show that the Hanna Center will truly be a multi-purpose facility, hosted three back-to-back major events on the Hanna Center's opening weekend. On October 18, Samford chose to make the first event the annual J. Roderick Davis Lecture, featuring author Walter Isaacson. On October 19, the center was officially christened and the 141st Annual Homecoming Alumni Gala Dinner was held on the Corts Arena floor. On October 20, the Homecoming concert, featuring Little Big Town, was held in the Corts Arena. The new fitness facility in the Pete Hanna Center for faculty and students opened on Monday November 26, 2007. The center is named after Birmingham businessman Pete Hanna, who played football for Samford when it was Howard College in the 1950s. The arena is named after Samford's president emeritus and his wife. Dr. Thomas Corts retired as Samford's President in May 2006 and died in 2009.
 Joe Lee Griffin Field - Samford's baseball program plays at Joe Lee Griffin Field, a 1,000-seat facility that was constructed in 2000.
 Samford Track and Soccer Complex - Located across Lakeshore Drive from the main campus, the Samford Track and Soccer Complex was opened in the spring of 2011. The facility hosted the 2011 Southern Conference Outdoor Track and Field Championships just hours after the official ribbon-cutting ceremony. The complex, which includes a nine-lane track with a regulation soccer field inside the track, is also scheduled to host the 2012 SoCon Women's Soccer Championship.
 Other facilities
 Pat M. Courington Tennis Pavilion
 Bulldog Softball Field

Mascot and school colors
Samford's intercollegiate athletics teams are nicknamed the Bulldogs, and the team is represented by a costumed bulldog, complete with spiked collar and nasty growl, at football and basketball games. Spike, as he is called, has also been known to appear at other competitions where Samford is competing.

Even when it was Howard College, the school's colors were Red and Blue. Today, the red tends to be a bright color and the blue is usually depicted as a darker, navy blue. Both colors are primary (though, as the name of the student fan club, The Red Sea, and the name of the student newspaper, The Crimson, show that many Samford students lean toward red).

Rivalries
Samford, as the newest member of the Southern Conference, has made new rivalries with their newfound conference foes. Their geographically closest conference opponents are Chattanooga and Mercer.

Samford also contends against SEC powerhouses and fellow Alabama institutions Alabama and Auburn in some sports—and often fares well.  For example, in 2006 the Samford baseball team defeated Auburn in the annual game at the Hoover Met and in 2010 the Samford basketball team defeated Auburn for the third time.  Samford's baseball team also defeated #21 Alabama in 2011.

References

External links